Eric Milligan (born 28 September 1981 in Scotland) is a Scottish former rugby union player who played for Glasgow Warriors. He normally plays at Hooker but can also play Prop.

He studied to be a teacher at Edinburgh University.

Milligan is now a teacher at St Columba's School, Kilmacolm. He is the Director of Sport and Physical Education and coaches the school rugby team.

Amateur career

He represented Glasgow District U16 at provincial level.

He played for Kilmarnock and Currie RFC before joining Glasgow Hawks He went on to captain the Hawks side.

While with the Warriors he played for Hawick.

He left the Warriors for a career as a teacher in 2009. That year he re-joined Glasgow Hawks.

Professional career

In 1997-98 season he was picked as one of the Glasgow Thistles to go to New Zealand and continue his rugby education in the summer of 1998. At the time he was still playing rugby for his school Stewarton Academy and Kilmarnock.

He was a backup player for the Warriors in seasons 2003-04 and 2004-05.

He was promoted from Glasgow Warrior's academy in 2005-06 season. He played 31 times for the Warriors.

International career

Milligan played for Scotland U16, Scotland U19 and Scotland U21 He also played for Scotland Club XV.

References

External links
ESPN Profile
Eurosport Profile

1981 births
Living people
Rugby union hookers
Scottish rugby union players
Glasgow Warriors players
Kilmarnock RFC players
Glasgow Hawks players
Hawick RFC players
Currie RFC players
Scotland Club XV international rugby union players